Al-Mansorah (also spelled Al-Mansoora or Al-Mansoorah ) ( Arabic : المنصورة), is a town in eastern region of Saudi Arabia and one of eastern towns and villages in Al-Ahsa. It is considered as one of the fast-growing towns of the Eastern-Region towns and villages. Al-Mansorah is almost always associated with Al-Shaharyn village ( Arabic: قرية الشهارين). The people of this town are with a close vicinity in relationship with their peers in al-Mansourah village.

History 
It was a long time ago when the grand-grand-grand fathers (almost a century  has a conflict with the mayor of Al-Omran village (Arabic: قرية العمران). Then, a group of families, those who had the conflict, gathered and decided to move away to somewhere else. They moved till reached to a remote land wherein nobody was living there and, at least, away from that mayor. This land had been dubbed Al-Mansoorah ( Arabic : المنصورة) because they thought that they won/took a licking against that mayor of which they disagreed with him and had some conflicts. In other words, they thought that they won a very important victory ( Arabic : إنتصار). The word Mansourah comes from the Arabic word of victory ( Arabic: إنتصار).

Education 
 
There are some schools in this village. The main ones are listed below: 
A. The elementary/primary schools:
1. The Primary School of Al-Mansourah (boys). ( Arabic: مدرسة المنصورة الإبتدائية )
2. The First Primary School of Al-Mansourah for girls. ( Arabic: المدرسة الأولى الإبتدائية للبنات بالمنصورة  ) 
3.  The Second Primary School of Al-Mansourah for girls. ( Arabic: المدرسة الثانية الإبتدائيةللبنات بالمنصورة  )

B. The intermediate/middle schools:
1. The Middle School of Al-Manourah (boys). ( Arabic: مدرسة المنصورة المتوسطة )
2. The First Middle of Al-Manourah for girls. ( Arabic: المدرسة الأولى المتوسطه للبنات  بالمنصورة  )

C. The secondary/high schools: 
1. High School of Mozdalifa (boys). ( Arabic: مدرسة مزدلفة الثانوية بالمنصورة )
2. High School of Al-Yamama (boys). ( Arabic: مدرسة اليمامة الثانوية بالمنصورة )
3. The First High School for girls. ( Arabic: المدرسة الأولى الثانوية للبنات بالمنصورة )

See also
Al-Ahsa

Geography of Saudi Arabia